Trichozoa is a group of excavates.

"Fornicata" is a similar grouping, but it excludes Parabasalia.

"Eopharyngia" is an even more narrow grouping, including Retortamonadida and Diplomonadida but not Carpediemonas.

Further References

References

External links
 Tree of Life Fornicata

Metamonads
Bikont subphyla